FK Minija is a semi-professional football club based in Kretinga, Lithuania. The team competes in I Lyga, the second division of Lithuanian football system.

History
After FK Minija Kretinga went bankrupt at the end of 2016 season, the Kretinga football promoters formed a phoenix club at the beginning of 2017.

Football Club "Minija" joined II Lyga's Western Zone in 2017. In that season team took the third place.

In 2018 the football club was reorganized into Public Organisation "Futbolo klubas Minija". Minija finished the season top of the league, equal on points with FK Babrungas Plungė. When this happens, the teams play a "golden match" to determine the higher position in the table. Minija won the match and were declared the winners of II Lyga Western Zone.

In 2019 the club had successfully promoted to I Lyga, and finished the season in 8th position.

Honours

League
II Lyga
 Winners (1): 2018

Seasons

Kit evoliution
 Adidas (kit manufacturer) in 2021.

Club colours 
 Blue and white

Current squad

|-----
! colspan="9" bgcolor="#B0D3FB" align="left" |
|----- bgcolor="#DFEDFD"

|-----
! colspan="9" bgcolor="#B0D3FB" align="left" |
|----- bgcolor="#DFEDFD"

|-----
! colspan="9" bgcolor="#B0D3FB" align="left" |
|----- bgcolor="#DFEDFD"

Staff

Coaches
  Vaidas Liutikas, (before 2017 season — 14 May 2017) 
  Arvydas Balsevičius, (14 May 2017 – end of 2018 season)
  Valdas Trakys (January 2019 – July 2020)
   Gvidas Juška (from July 2020 – the end of 2021 season).
  Darius Žindulis, (from Januari 2022)

References

External links
  
 Facebook "Minija"
 1lyga.lt
 Soccerway
 SofaScore
 FlashScore

Football clubs in Lithuania
2017 establishments in Lithuania
Association football clubs established in 2017
Phoenix clubs (association football)